The Willkommen Collective is a Brighton-based community of musicians, promoters and artists. The collective includes the bands Sons of Noel and Adrian, The Leisure Society, Kristin McClement, The Climbers, The Miserable Rich, Shoreline and many more. They also run a record label, Willkommen Records, and put on monthly gigs in Brighton, England. The bands share many members and often work collectively.

History
In May 2009, Willkommen Collective ran three shows as part of a residency at the Brighton Festival. In June, July and August 2009 the collective ran a series of shows dubbed the "Willkommen takeover..." series including an event at the Union Chapel, Islington, Stanmer House and De La Warr Pavilion. The Stanmer House show has become an annual festival known as Foxtrot and featured Laura Marling and Anna Calvi in 2010 and Herman Dune and Sam Amidon in 2011.

In February 2010 the Collective performed en masse as "The Willkommen Orchestra" at King's Place, London and Brighton Unitarian Church. The set included selections from the repertoire of The Miserable Rich, Shoreline, Sons of Noel and Adrian and the new 'studio supergroup' The Climbers. In the past they have performed showcases at End Of The Road Festival, The Big Chill, Brighton Festival and The Great Escape Festival. In 2010 the Collective took five bands to Positivus festival in Latvia and seven bands to The Big Chill in the UK.

Members of the Collective
The Collective is a sprawling group of individuals with no fixed membership, but these are some key members and some of the Willkommen Collective bands they have performed with, live and on record:

 Will Calderbank – cello and piano with The Miserable Rich, The Leisure Society, Sons of Noel and Adrian, Shoreline, The Climbers, Gambol, and Django Spears. Calderbank also records under the name Atlas Crease. The name of the Collective is inspired by his name due to his ubiquity.
 Jacob Richardson – guitar and vocals with Sons of Noel and Adrian, Shoreline and The Climbers
 Mike Siddell – violin with The Miserable Rich, The Leisure Society, Sons of Noel and Adrian, Shoreline, and The Climbers. He has played live with Mumford and Sons.
 Tom Cowan – guitar with Shoreline, Sons of Noel and Adrian and Katapults
 Nick Hemming – vocals, guitar, banjo, ukulele and mandolin with The Leisure Society, The Climbers, Shoreline, and Sons of Noel and Adrian.
 Alistair Strachan – trumpet, cornet, flugelhorn and piano with Sons of Noel and Adrian, Mary Hampton, Hamilton Yarns, and Shoreline.
 Catherine Cardin – vocals and percussion with Sons of Noel and Adrian, Redwood Red, Laish and The Climbers
Marcus Hamblett – played various instruments live and/or on record with Sons of Noel and Adrian, Alessi's Ark, The Mariner's Children, Peggy Sue, The Leisure Society, Eyes & No Eyes, Lulu and The Lampshades, Rozi Plain, Woodpecker Wooliams and Rachael Dadd.
Emma Gatrill – clarinet, bass clarinet, harp, accordion and vocals with Sons of Noel and Adrian, and Laish.
Daniel Green – drums and vocals with Sons of Noel and Adrian, guitar and vocals with Laish, has also played live with Shoreline and Curly Hair.
Helen Whitaker – flute and vocals with The Leisure Society and Sons of Noel and Adrian.

References

External links
Willkommen Records

English artist groups and collectives
English culture
Musical collectives
Music in Brighton and Hove